"Not It" is the fifth episode of the thirty-fourth season of the American animated television series The Simpsons, and the 733rd episode overall. It aired in the United States on Fox on October 23, 2022. The episode was directed by Steven Dean Moore, and written by Cesar Mazariegos.

From September 29 to October 9, 2022, a contest was held that allowed viewers in the United States to submit spooky Krusty fan art. The works of 20 winners were presented during the credits of the episode.

Plot
In Kingfield in 1990, a young Barney Gumble plays with a paper boat in the gutter on a rainy day. When the boat goes into the sewer, Barney finds Krusto, who drags him into the sewer, killing him. Sometime after this, while putting up missing person posters for Barney, Homer is attacked by local bullies Super-Intense-Kid Chalmers, Seymour Skinner and Dewey Largo. Homer sees Krusto in the bushes, watching the bullying. Homer calls out to the clown, whom the bullies do not see, and escapes down the hill, with the bullies following. As they get to the river at the bottom, a group of kids, the Losers, consisting of Marge Bouvier, Comic Book Guy, Carl Carlson and Moe Syszlak, come to Homer's aid. Marge hits Chalmers in the face with a baseball and the bullies run away. The Losers take Homer to their clubhouse, where they share stories of their encounters with Krusto. Determined to stop him, the Losers go to the Kingfield Clown Archives to research Krusto. Marge and Homer discover that Krusto has had several shows over many years and he was not funny in any of them, and has resurfaced every 27 years to kill children. As Marge and Homer show a clip from Krusto's 1963 show The Yuk-Yuk Hour with Krusto!, Krusto emerges from the television and tries to kill Comic Book Guy. Homer stabs Krusto with some garden shears before Marge shuts the TV off, temporarily defeating Krusto.

The gang then arm themselves and go to the Channel 14 studios to defeat Krusto. Inside, Homer sees a box labeled "Free Candy" and opens it, revealing Krusto hidden inside. The Losers attack Krusto with their weapons, but they are ineffective. As Krusto starts to brag about being invincible, he slips on some marbles and goes through a lengthy slapstick comedy routine where he hurts himself repeatedly. The children all laugh at this, which surprises Krusto as it is the first time children have actually laughed at him. Krusto continues to hurt himself for laughs until Marge gives him some cherry bombs to eat. Krusto eats the cherry bombs and explodes, defeating him. Later, the gang makes a pact to reunite in 27 years to kill Krusto for good. Then Marge makes out with Comic Book Guy, who had stolen and taken credit for a love poem that Homer wrote for her in the library.

27 years later in 2017, Moe has become a rock and roll ventriloquist; Carl has become an astronaut; Marge has started a successful seltzer company, and she and Comic Book Guy have gotten married and have two children named Bert and Lizzie; while Homer remains in Kingfield where he runs a local bar, D'ohs Tavern. When Jimbo, Dolph, Kearney, and Nelson are killed by Krusto, who baited them with a newly-opened pie shop, Homer calls up the other Losers to help him defeat Krusto once more. Comic Book Guy argues with Marge as he refuses to go and help the gang stop Krusto, but Marge leaves in the night to go by herself.

As the gang reunites at D'ohs and tries to come up with a plan to defeat Krusto once and for all, Comic Book Guy arrives with the kids to bring Marge home. Marge tells the kids to wait in the car while she argues with Comic Book Guy. Bert and Lizzie then walk past a secondhand store and get kidnapped by Krusto, which he reveals to the Losers on their phones.

The gang then returns to Channel 14 to rescue the kids and tell Krusto that they have gotten over their childhood fears so he has no power over them anymore. Krusto then reveals that adults have something tastier than fears - anxieties. He makes the gang see the things they are anxious about and grows more powerful from the laughter of his ghost audience. He also reveals that Comic Book Guy did not write the love poem he gave Marge. Bert and Lizzie realize that he gets his power from the sign commanding the ghost audience to laugh. Homer gives Marge a rock to throw at the sign, and Marge realizes that Homer wrote the poem for her. When Krusto tries to eat Marge, Comic Book Guy sacrifices himself by jumping in the way, allowing Marge to throw the rock at the sign, destroying it. The ghost kids go off to Heaven as Krusto loses all his power and dies. Marge tells her dying husband that although she cannot forgive him for lying to her, she is proud of him for finally showing his bravery. Bert, Lizzie and the surviving Losers ride out of the ruins, and Homer and Marge get together.

On their UFO, Kang and Kodos realize that their invasion plan has failed and look through other books to decide on what they can use next for world domination.

Cultural references
 The plot of the episode is a parody of the 2017 supernatural horror film It, while Krusto is a Pennywise parody of Krusty the Clown.
 The hooligan Davy Largo has a T-shirt with the name of conductor John Philip Sousa, in rock style.
 In an alternate future, Metal Moe performs the song "Rock You Like a Hurricane" by Scorpions.
 When the adult Homer calls the Losers in his room, there is a poster of "Cypress Hill" on the walls.
 In an alternate future, in a painting with a boat, the boat sinks.

Reception

Viewing figures
The episode was watched by 3.63 million U.S. viewers during its initial broadcast, per Nielsen estimates.

Critical response 
Tony Sokol of Den of Geek rated the episode 4 out of 5 stars stating, "The Simpsons''' "Treehouse of Horror" episodes are always season highlights, and the extra added clowning is a welcome treat (the official Treehouse of Horror: XXXIII is set to premiere next week). Written by Cesar Mazariegos, and directed by Steven Dean Moore, "Not It" is quite scary, at times, and every frame carries both thrills and spills. The clown motif provides a panorama of ways to make the audience choke on laugher, even before a school bully's intestines get twisted into balloon animals. The parody works best because of the details, and some of the lines are individually hysterical. Not all, but it's not It, which gives its clown all the last laughs, even when modified for a Gen Z audience."

Matthew Swigonski of Bubbleblabber gave the episode a 7.5 out of 10 stating, ""Not It" wasn't a particularly funny episode, but it was a strong and captivating story elevated by a well-written parody script. It was also very interesting seeing the alternate lives of these familiar characters, but Homer's "virgin loser" lifestyle was the showstopper. This was a very solid entry into the "Treehouse Of Horror''" collection with a full episode dedicated to one story. "Not It" may have lacked a constant stream of laughs, but the audience should still feel captivated nonetheless."

References

External links
 

The Simpsons (season 34) episodes
2022 American television episodes
Black comedy
Child versions of cartoon characters
Coming-of-age fiction
Fiction about child murder
Fiction about shapeshifting
Horror comedy
It (novel)
Parodies of films
Parodies of horror
Parody television episodes
Treehouse of Horror
Works about clowns
Works about fear